The 1991 Southern Conference baseball tournament was held at College Park in Charleston, South Carolina, from April 27 through 30. Fourth seeded  won the tournament and earned the Southern Conference's automatic bid to the 1991 NCAA Division I baseball tournament. It was the Paladins first tournament win.

The tournament used a double-elimination format, with top seeded The Citadel receiving a bye to the second day in order to compensate for the odd number of teams in the league.

Seeding

Results

Bracket 
Bracket to be included

Game results

All-Tournament Team

References 

Tournament
Southern Conference Baseball Tournament
Southern Conference baseball tournament
Southern Conference baseball tournament